was a Japanese glass artist. He received training early in his career as a worker in the factory of Toshichi Iwata and his early work shows Iwata's influence in style and materials. Fujita later matured as a glass artist and developed his own, unique style. With Histoshi Iwata, son of Toshichi Iwata, and fifty other artists, Fujita established the Japan Glass Artcrafts Association in 1972. 

Kyohei Fujita is best known for his glass boxes with complicated surface decorations, and his work was included in the exhibit One of a Kind: The Studio Craft Movement at the Metropolitan Museum of Art in New York City, December 22, 2006 – September 3, 2007.

References
 Boone, Thomas, David J. Wagner, Kikuo Atarashi and Shigeki Fukunaga, Kyohei Fujita, First American Glass Exhibition, Lathrup Village, Michigan, Habatat Galleries, 1981.
 Fujita, Kyohei, Free Blown Glassware by Kyohei Fujita, Tokyo, Takashimaya, 1992.
 Fujita, Kyohei, Kyohei Fujita, Unikate in Glas aus Japan, Coburg, Kunstsammlungen der Veste Coburg, 1977.
 Lynggaard, Finn, Kyohei Fujita, The Man and his Work, Copenhagen, Borgen København 2000.
 Maedebach, Heino, Kyohei Fujita, Brosch, 1977.
 Biography page of Kyohei Fujita Museum of Glass . 
 Biography page of Kyohei Fujita Whatcom Museum Fujita's art developed under the tutorship of Toshichi Iwata, one of Japan's first artists to explore glass as a contemporary art form.

External links
 Kyohei Fujita Museum of Glass in Matsushima, Japan 

Glass artists
Japanese artists
People from Tokyo
1921 births
2004 deaths